is a Japanese astronomer from Toyota, Aichi, Japan. Between 1984 and 1992, he has discovered 42 minor planets mostly in collaboration with astronomers Takeshi Urata and Toshimasa Furuta.

A local guide for the Brother Earth 

He is the discoverer of main-belt asteroid 3533 Toyota and it is named after his home town. Asteroid 5526 Kenzo is named after him. For the local community, Suzuki is a lecturer for astronomy and participates in programs at the Brother Earth planetarium, or the world largest planetarium at Nagoya City Science Museum in Aichi Prefecture, Japan. He lets the visitors, ranging from groups of elementary school students to adults, to observe planets through telescopes and shares his experience and insight as a veteran astronomer.

List of discovered minor planets

Bibliography 

Books

Journals

Magazines
 Discontinued, published between 1949 and 1983 through volume 15, no.1 to volume 49, no.6 (literary translates as "Astronomy and Meteorology".) Changed name to "Gekkan Temmon" in 1984 which was discontinued since 2007.

See also 
 List of minor planet discoverers

References

External links 
 Nagoya City Science Museum

Living people
20th-century Japanese astronomers
People from Toyota, Aichi
Discoverers of asteroids

1950 births